ANFA may refer to:

In football:
All Nepal Football Association, the governing body of football in Nepal
Asociación Nacional de Fútbol Amateur, the governing body of amateur Chilean football 

In finance:
Agreement on Net Financial Assets, an agreement between the European Central Bank and central banks in the Eurozone

In architecture:
Academy of Neuroscience for Architecture

See also 
 Anfa, an ancient toponym for Casablanca